Magrib (or Reprieve) is a 1993 Malayalam film by P. T. Kunju Muhammed. The film is about the relative shift in the frame of references ruling the familial relations in a traditional community having specific cultural ethos, that of the Muslims in the South Malabar. It stars Murali, Sreenivasan, V. K. Sreeraman and Saranya.

Plot
The story is woven around Razaq, a convict lunatic confined in the asylum for many years. He had killed his wife in anger, suspecting her of infidelity. An infant girl child of the couple who had become an orphan, was brought up by the joint family. Time inexorably passes and the time has arrived for the girl's marriage. But this created a major problem in the close-knit family. The family members, who at the outset set out to secure the release of Razaq from the lunatic asylum gre wiser when its possibility was seen turning into reality and then backed out. The very family which had been believing till then to have shared the bitter destiny of Razaq could not bring itself to approve of his emerging in their midst, in flesh and blood. He would be casting the shadow of death on the family's honour. The presence of a murderer-father at the marriage of his daughter would spoil the happiness of the newly married. Even the bride, Mumtaz, did not want to see her father.

Set against the ups and downs of an ancestral Muslim family spanning over half a century, it subtly builds upon the bitter-sweet experiences of family members and their interactions, arising out of concrete situations, with the result that Razaq's dreams of freedom are shattered and he is left with the desolate silence of the asylum.

Cast
 Murali as Razaq
 Sreenivasan as Muhammadunni
 V. K. Sreeraman as Aboobacker
 Saranya as Arifa
 Reshmi Soman

Reception
The film follows a "simple prismatic narrative style". It received rave reviews upon release but was a box office failure.

External links
 

1990s Malayalam-language films
1993 directorial debut films
1993 films